Leocarpus is a genus of slime moulds belonging to the family Physaraceae. The genus has a cosmopolitan distribution.

Species
The following species are recognised in the genus Leocarpus:

Leocarpus fragilis 
Leocarpus granulatus 
Leocarpus melaleucus 
Leocarpus minutus 
Leocarpus nitens

References

Amoebozoa genera
Physaraceae